Jamie James Malonzo Orme (born July 31, 1996) is a Filipino-American professional basketball player for the Barangay Ginebra San Miguel of Philippine Basketball Association (PBA).

Professional career

NorthPort Batang Pier (2021–2022)
Malonzo was selected second overall by the NorthPort Batang Pier during the PBA Season 46 draft.

Barangay Ginebra San Miguel (2022–present)
On September 20, 2022, Malonzo was traded to the Barangay Ginebra San Miguel for Prince Caperal, Arvin Tolentino, and a 2022 first-round pick.

PBA career statistics

As of the end of 2021 season

Season-by-season averages

|-
| align=left | 
| align=left | NorthPort
| 25 || 34.8 || .442 || .298 || .596 || 8.7 || 2.4 || 1.4 || 1.3 || 14.1
|- class="sortbottom"
| style="text-align:center;" colspan="2"|Career
| 25 || 34.8 || .442 || .298 || .596 || 8.7 || 2.4 || 1.4 || 1.3 || 14.1

Personal life
Malonzo is the son of an African-American father and a Filipino mother who traces her roots in Batangas. He uses his mother's maiden name, Malonzo, on his jerseys during his UAAP and PBA career to represent his Filipino roots. He is eligible to play for the Philippines national team as a local under FIBA eligibility rules since he received his own Philippine passport when he was eight years old.

Notes

References

External links
PBA.ph profile
Portland State Vikings bio

1996 births
Living people
American men's basketball players
American sportspeople of Filipino descent
Barangay Ginebra San Miguel players
Basketball players from Seattle
Citizens of the Philippines through descent
De La Salle Green Archers basketball players
Filipino men's basketball players
Highline College alumni
NorthPort Batang Pier draft picks
NorthPort Batang Pier players
Philippine Basketball Association All-Stars
Philippines men's national basketball team players
Portland State Vikings men's basketball players
Power forwards (basketball)